Ling Yun (29 June 1917 – 15 March 2018), born as Wu Peilin, was a politician of the People's Republic of China, who served as the first Minister of State Security, from June 1983 (officially from July 1) to September 1985.

A protégé of General Luo Ruiqing, he headed the 1st Bureau of the Ministry of Public Security during the early Maoist years, dealing with suppression of political, ethnic and religious opponents of the Communist Party.

Biography
Ling Yun was born in Jiaxing, Zhejiang on 29 June 1917. He joined the Chinese Communist Party in April 1938 and became a guerrilla fighter in Shanxi Province. He received military training at the "Shanxi Youth Officers School", run by warlord Yan Xishan, who, at the time, was working together with the Communists to oppose the Japanese invasion. Later, he moved to neighboring Shaanxi Province, where he studied at the "Northern Shaanxi Public School", which was established in 1937 by the Communist Party to train anti-Japanese military and political officers. After graduating, he was posted at the headquarters of the Communist Party in Yan'an, where he joined and advanced in the ranks of the Central Social Affairs Department, led, at the time, by Kang Sheng.

After the outbreak of the Chinese Civil War, Ling became a member of the North China land reform team led by Kang Sheng, and was active in seizing land from wealthy landlords and distributing it to peasants. In August 1948, he served as the Director of the Public Security Bureau (police chief) of the city of Weifang, after it was captured by the People's Liberation Army, and from 1949 to 1952 he was Deputy Director of the Public Security Bureau of Jinan, the capital of Shandong.

From 1952 to 1966, Ling was based in Beijing, as Deputy Director and then Director of the 1st Bureau of the Ministry of Public Security, and from 1963 Deputy Minister of Public Security, handling very sensitive issues, as his Bureau dealt with the suppression of political, ethnic and religious separatism.

After the outbreak of the Cultural Revolution in 1966, the leadership of the Ministry of Public Security (with the notable exception of the Minister himself, Xie Fuzhi, who was an ally of the radicals) was accused of having created "an underground counter-revolutionary Ministry of Public Security headed by Luo Ruiqing" (the previous Minister). All 7 Deputy Ministers were removed from office, as were 63 department heads within the Ministry. Ling himself was expelled from the Communist Party, arrested, tortured by Red Guards, and then sent to do manual labor.

After the Cultural Revolution, Ling Yun was restored to all his posts and was again appointed Deputy Ministrer of Public Security in 1978, serving until 1983.

In June 1983, Deng Xiaoping, who had risen to supreme power in China, decided to create a new security, intelligence and regime protection agency by merging the counter-intelligence and political security departments of the Ministry of Public Security with the Central Investigation Department (which had been China's primary civilian intelligence apparatus since 1955). Deng did this because he wanted to sideline Luo Qingchang, who had been the Director of the Central Investigation Department since 1973, and strongly opposed Deng's policies (he was loyal to the Maoist legacy).

As a result, the new Ministry of State Security was established, and Ling Yun, as an experienced counterintelligence specialist, became the first Minister. Ling remained in office until September 1985, when he retired and was replaced by the much younger Jia Chunwang

A centenarian, Ling died in Beijing on March 15, 2018. On March 21, Xinhua News Agency released a message: “An outstanding member of the Communist Party of China, a long-tested and loyal communist fighter, Comrade Ling Yun, former Party Secretary and Minister of the Ministry of State Security, died on March 15, 2018 due to illness". On May 13, the People's Daily also published an obituary full of praise.

References

1917 births
2018 deaths
Chinese centenarians
Men centenarians
Ministers of State Security of the People's Republic of China
Politicians from Jiaxing
People's Republic of China politicians from Zhejiang
Chinese Communist Party politicians from Zhejiang